Sneak Previews (known as Opening Soon...at a Theater Near You from 1975 to 1977 and Sneak Previews Goes Video from 1989 to 1991) is an American film review show that ran for over two decades on Public Broadcasting Service (PBS). It was created by WTTW, a PBS affiliate in Chicago, Illinois. It premiered on November 26, 1975 as a monthly local-only show called Opening Soon...at a Theater Near You and was renamed in 1977 to Sneak Previews and it became a biweekly show in 1978 airing nationally on PBS. By 1980, it was a weekly series airing on over 180 stations, and it was the highest rated weekly entertainment series in the history of public broadcasting. The show's final broadcast was on October 4, 1996.

Format
The show featured two critics who would present short clips of movies in current release and then debate the merits of the films, energetically defending their remarks if the other critic disagreed. A designated "dog of the week" was also featured, with "Spot the Wonder Dog" barking on cue as an introduction.

Episodes from the first seven seasons ended with one of the hosts saying "See you at the movies." Many episodes from season eight through fourteen and again from season seventeen through twenty-one ended with the hosts' reminder to "save us the aisle seats." Episodes from season eighteen through twenty (when it was known as Sneak Previews Goes Video) ended with the hosts reminder to "don't forget to rewind that tape."

Some episodes were known as Take 2 shows which replaced the review of recently released films with themed topics such as "Women in Danger", and slasher films of the 1970s and early 1980s. On one occasion, Siskel and Ebert invited the viewer into a day in their lives as they screened films.

History

The show first aired in 1975 on a monthly basis under the name Opening Soon at a Theater Near You and, after two successful seasons, was renamed Sneak Previews. The show originally featured Roger Ebert, a film critic from the Chicago Sun-Times, and Gene Siskel, a film critic from the Chicago Tribune.

The two newspapers were competitors, and so were Siskel and Ebert. As Ebert wrote after Siskel's death in 1999:

The tension between the two men made the show's production difficult and time-consuming at first:

Over time the two men became close personal friends while remaining professional rivals, and Ebert described their relationship before Siskel's death as "no one else could possibly understand how meaningless was the hate, how deep was the love".

Post-Siskel and Ebert
The success of the show led WTTW to decide to syndicate it to commercial television. Siskel and Ebert left Sneak Previews in 1982, citing contractual differences with WTTW. They indicated that they were offered a contract and asked to "take it or leave it", and they chose the latter option.  The two critics were soon featured in At the Movies with Gene Siskel and Roger Ebert, a similar show created with  Tribune Entertainment and replaced in 1986 by a Disney-produced long-running show first known as Siskel & Ebert & the Movies (later adopting the title At the Movies in 2008).

After Siskel and Ebert left the show, more than 300 critics auditioned to become their replacements, among them being legendary film critic Pauline Kael. Ebert's future co-host on At the Movies, Richard Roeper, auditioned while still a college student, for which he was obviously turned down.

In 1982, WTTW signed Neal Gabler and Jeffrey Lyons as replacements for Siskel and Ebert on Sneak Previews. Because Siskel and Ebert had trademarked the phrase 'Two Thumbs Up', Lyons and Gabler would simply give a 'yes' or 'no' judgement to a movie they reviewed. Each post-1982 episode (with the exception of 1989 to 1991) ended with the catch phrase "Don't forget to save us the aisle seats." Neal Gabler left Sneak Previews in 1985, citing philosophical differences with the direction of the show, and was replaced by Michael Medved. Before replacing Gabler, Medved had cameo appearances on the show, presenting the "Golden Turkey Awards," based on the book, and a variation of Siskel & Ebert's "Spot the Wonder Dog/Dog of the Week."

Cancellation
Although Sneak Previews continued on PBS for 14 years after Ebert and Siskel left, the program did not maintain the popularity it enjoyed during their tenure. In 1983, Tom Shales of The Washington Post negatively said of the two critics hosting at the time (Lyons and Gabler) as "two New York yokels...Jeffrey Lyons, to whom the notion of insight or analysis is more foreign than Jupiter, and Neal Gabler, who talks down to viewers as if they were all 3 years old and looks into the camera the way Dracula regards a vacant neck."

The show's title was changed to Sneak Previews Goes Video in 1989, and concentrated on home video releases, but returned to its original title in 1991. PBS continued to broadcast the program until the fall of 1996, when it was cancelled due to a lack of underwriting.

In popular culture
In the early-to-mid eighties to the early nineties, Sesame Street had a recurring parody sketch, "Sneak Peek Previews", which illustrated differences of opinion.  In a run-down movie theater, Oscar the Grouch and Telly Monster together watched a short video segment, usually from the Sesame Street archives.  After the video, Oscar invariably disliked it, and Telly enjoyed it, and they each told why. Siskel and Ebert appeared in one sketch in 1991 in which they instruct the hosts on how their thumbs up/thumbs down rating system works. At the end of sketch, Oscar asks if there could be a thumbs sideways ratings, and goads the two men about whether or not that would be acceptable, as Ebert likes the idea, but Siskel does not.

References

External links

Film criticism television series
1975 American television series debuts
1980s American television series
PBS original programming
Television series by WTTW
1996 American television series endings
English-language television shows
Chicago television shows
Gene Siskel
Roger Ebert
Siskel and Ebert